Hyalornis livida is a moth of the family Geometridae first described by Claude Herbulot in 1973. It is found in Cameroon.

See also
List of moths of Cameroon

References

Endemic fauna of Cameroon
Ennominae
Insects of Cameroon
Moths of Africa